The 1995–96 FIS Ski Jumping World Cup was the 17th World Cup season in ski jumping and the 6th official World Cup season in ski flying. It began in Lillehammer, Norway on 2 December 1995 and finished in Oslo, Norway on 16 March 1996. The individual World Cup was won by Andreas Goldberger and Nations Cup by Finland.

Lower competitive circuits this season included the Grand Prix and Continental Cup.

Map of world cup hosts 
All 21 locations which have been hosting world cup events for men this season. 

 Four Hills Tournament
 World Cup & Ski Flying World Championships

Calendar

Men

Men's team

Standings

Overall

Ski Jumping (JP) Cup

Ski Flying

Nations Cup

Four Hills Tournament

References 

World cup
World cup
FIS Ski Jumping World Cup